Petrocephalus boboto is a species of electric fish in the genus Petrocephalus. It is so far only known from the holotype collected from Congo River at Yangambi, the Democratic Republic of the Congo. The specific name boboto is Lingala word for "peace".

Description
Petrocephalus arnegardi holotype measures  SL. It is a gray/silvery fish with metallic reflection on the flanks and head. There are three distinct black marks on each side of the body: one at the base of the pectoral fins, one at the base of the caudal fin, and one below the first anterior rays of the dorsal fin. Mouth is small and subterminal.

References

Weakly electric fish
Mormyridae
Fish of the Democratic Republic of the Congo
Endemic fauna of the Democratic Republic of the Congo
Fish described in 2014